The 1977–78 Albanian National Championship was the 39th season of the Albanian National Championship, the top professional league for association football clubs, since its establishment in 1930.

Overview
It was contested by 12 teams, and Vllaznia won the championship.

League table

Note: '17 Nëntori' is Tirana, 'Traktori' is Lushnja, 'Lokomotiva Durrës' is Teuta, 'Labinoti' is Elbasani

Results

Relegation playoff 

Skënderbeu were relegated to 1978–79 Kategoria e Dytë.

References
Albania - List of final tables (RSSSF)

Kategoria Superiore seasons
1
Albania